The 2018–19 Belgian Women's Super League season is the 4th edition since its establishment in 2015. Anderlecht are the defending champions.

Teams

Stadia and locations

League Standings
In the first stage teams play each other four times, for 20 matches each.

League table

Season statistics

Top scorers
Updated to match(es) played on 7 December 2018.

References

External links
 Official website

Bel
1